Belloc-Saint-Clamens is a commune in the Gers department in southwestern France.

Geography
The Petite Baïse forms part of the commune's northeastern border. Belloc-Saint-Clamens is located in seismic zone 2.

Land use

The land use of the municipality, as reflected in the European Corine Land Cover (CLC) soil biophysical ladle database, is marked by the importance of agricultural territories (81.9% in 2018), up from 76.9% in 1990. The detailed distribution in 2018 is as follows: arable land (47.5%), heterogeneous agricultural areas (27%), forests (18.1%), grasslands (7.4%)9.

The IGN also provides an online tool to compare the evolution over time of the land use of the commune (or territories at different scales). Several eras are accessible in the form of maps or aerial photos: the Cassini map (18th century), the staff map (1820-1866) and the current period (1950 to present)

Population

Culture

The Chapel of Saint-Clamens: The commune has a Romanesque chapel (11th century), located on the way to Santiago de Compostela.
It has been listed as a historical monument since 189018. This chapel was dedicated to Clement I,pope from 89 to 97. The name of the commune, Saint-Clamens, is itself a Gascon form of the name of Clement.

Re-employment materials bear witness to a rather large Gallo-Roman presence. The chapel throughout history has hardly undergone any redesign. It has kept its walls in small apparatus, its campary wall, its Romanesque windows.

Beneath the rustic awning is a 4th-century Gallo-Roman funerary cippe and some mosaic debris on the ground.

The unique nave contains an octagonal baptismal vat decorated with pampre and on its walls, 15th century paintings. The nave, in its current state, is little more than 14 m in length.

In the seven-sided bedside, it is possible to admire a marble sarcophagus of Saint-Béat,a 4th-century paleo-Christian from the school of Arles. It was excavated in 1864 at guilhou. It is richly carved with scenes of harvest and allegories about the flow of life. On the large visible side of the lid, putti play hoop. At the ends appear two large hairs with a well-drawn profile and a fine nose. On the vat, characters offer the deceased the symbols of wealth and creativity implemented on his estate: leafy twig, sickle, wheatbasket, wheat sheaf, basket and fruit-laden branches. At the foot of the characters, small animals. On the small sides of the sarcophagus were carved the scenes of the harvest. Today, the sarcophagus serves as a base for the altar of the chapel.

On the outside, theapse is reinforced at the corners by three buttresses of very small thickness but great width in which are pierced windows. These windows have stained glass windows, two of which are antique, with no other decorative motifs than diamonds and squares set with lead.

The southern portal dates back to the 16th century.

The capitals, both inside and outside, are from the same era. Their peeling is simple but has above the astragalus, a cylindrical part that initiates the spine. Twists adorn the astragalus itself and the simply engraved decoration is rowed with palmettes, wavy stems bearing half-palmettes, braided strands, half-triangle or semicircle threads or simple ripples.

Painted wooden statues are attached to the south wall of the chapel. It includes Bishop Saint Clamens. At the bottom of the chapel rest on the floor, eight-sided baptismal fonts.

Note the frescoes on the north side: a 12th-century crucifixion (the Virgin Prays and Mary Magdalene makes an offering). The inRI-marked headband crosses the wood of the cross giving an unusual perspective effect.

The Church of theAssumption,renamed in the 19th century and newly restored, dominates the centre of the village by its rectangular tower which ends in terrace.
Belloc castral site. A castle is mentioned in 1209 in the berdoues cartular; it then belongs to the Montesquioufamily, and it seems to partly to the Counts of Astarac (acts 102 and 784). This fortress was located to the west of the church, at the top of the hillside that overlooks the steep slope of the Baïse Valley20, on the site of a current private property. No remnants of the former stately home are visible today in elevation.
Former Lanecastet Castle. Cassini's map shows a noble house in "Sabatié," whose name is still used for the building visible on the 1823 land registry. The State-Major map mentions "Lanecastel" in the 19thcentury, and today the house is named "The Dané". No remnants of the former stately home can be seen in elevation. Private property, not visited.
Saint-Clamens castral site. The castle of Saint-Clamens is reported as ruined in 1198, in the map of Berdoues19 : "totam ex integro terram [...] a Sent Clem que terra is inter ecclesiam and castellum leaking from Sent Clem" (Act 62). It was some distance from the parish church, towards the hillside: it is probably its location indicated by the place called A la Mothe mentioned in the land registry of 175022,20
Castral Motte of Serres. The castellum de Serres appears in 1174 in the berdoues cartular as possession of the lords of Marrast (Act 5). The mention refers to a point located 750 meters south of the church of Belloc, in a grove where some earthworks appear: one can guess a platform of low height less than 2 meters, with a subordinate enclosure

See also
Communes of the Gers department

References

Communes of Gers